Nahro Dehri is a village in Aurangabad district, Bihar. Nahro Dehri is a small village in Bihar, with a population of 300. Nahro Dehri is located 30 kilometres north from Aurangabad, the district city of Bihar. 20 Kilometres north from Anugrah Narayan Road Railway station. 5.5 Kilometres east from NH-98.

Residents are mostly Hindus of the Rajput caste. Main language of this village is Hindi and Magadhi.

Education 
95% people of this village are well educated. This village has a private school named Shri Tridandi Dev Vidya Niketan and a Government Primary School. 

Villages in Aurangabad district, Bihar